Mikayla Jane Nogueira is an American social media influencer, known for posting makeup tutorials on TikTok and Instagram. As of February 2023, Nogueira has 14.6 million followers on TikTok, over 2.4 million followers on her Instagram page, and over 441K followers on her personal Instagram account.

Early life
Nogueira was born to Patrice, who is an artist and an elementary school counselor, and Michael Nogueira. She has an older brother of three years. Her family is mostly of Portuguese descent. She was raised in East Freetown, Massachusetts, and graduated from Apponequet Regional High School in 2016. She has stated that her love for makeup started when she bought Avon Products from a friend of her mother, as early as 10 years old. She started with simple makeup routines and grew more proficient. In high school, she was a member of DECA, where she competed in business competitions, relating it to the beauty industry.

Nogueira attended Bryant University, where she graduated with a Bachelor of Arts in communications in 2020. In college, Nogueira was an intern for a radio station. Nogueira had started graduate school in 2020, but "ended up dropping out of school when I found out I'd have to do it full-time instead of part-time because of the pandemic". This allowed her to continue making beauty videos full time.

Career

Early years 
Prior to her notability from TikTok, Nogueira started posting beauty and makeup content on the social media app Tumblr as early as 2013. Nogueira experienced success on this platform, but not to the extent she later would on TikTok. Nogueira also once had a YouTube channel, where she would post beauty videos and vlogs. Her old channel has since been taken down. For the next few years, Nogueira did not post as much on social media as she was a full-time student.

TikTok 
Due to the COVID-19 pandemic, in March 2020, Nogueira started making TikTok videos. Nogueira first used the platform after making the suggestion to her mother, a teacher, use it as a way to continue educating her students. Nogueira created a TikTok page in her name to help her mother learn the intricacies of TikTok. The first videos on her page were educational videos on their family farm. Nogueira next posted "The Catfish Challenge", a viral before and after challenge featuring a user's profile photo next to their makeup-free look. This video gained thousands of views within hours of its release. Nogueira's account grew to 2.8 million followers on TikTok in just eight months, and she now has 11.9 million, her voice fueling the growth of the account. Nogueira posts tutorials, reviews, beauty routines, promotions, and other beauty and makeup videos.

Since the success of her videos, Nogueira has been the subject of articles in major publications, including Allure and The Boston Globe.

In December 2020, Nogueira won the American Influencer Award for Emerging Makeup Artist of the Year.

Nogueira was employed by Ulta Beauty as a beauty advisor until she started working full time for her own brand, Mikayla J Makeup, in late 2020.

As of October 2022, Nogueira has over 13.6 million followers on TikTok and 2.4 million on Instagram.

Nogueira has received criticism about her "Boston accent". Critics have posted interviews and videos of her before her popularity on the internet, claiming she "talks different." In response to this, Nogueira states: "I went to school for Communications with a primary focus on radio […] So over the years, I created this voice that I would use when I was on the radio or at my internship. Everyone has a customer service voice, right? So, when I first started making my TikToks, I would use my radio voice because it was professional. It was my first time putting myself on a camera to tons of people so I was wicked nervous because my voice has been this topic of discussion my entire life and I didn’t know how people would react." Viewers have also criticized some of her cosmetic reviews as being misleading.

Personal life 
Nogueira has been open about her struggle with acne in her adulthood. Nogueira has also admitted via an Instagram post that she has struggled with an eating disorder and struggles with body image issues. In the same post, she claimed she was bullied throughout grade school and received slurs like "tranny".

References 

Living people
American make-up artists
American cosmetics businesspeople
American TikTokers
American people of Portuguese descent
Social media influencers
People from Bristol County, Massachusetts
Artists from Massachusetts
Bryant University alumni
Year of birth missing (living people)